Nozipho may refer to:

 Nozipho Bhengu (1974–2006), South African woman whose death from an AIDS-related illness intensified the controversy about how AIDS is treated in South Africa
 Nozipho Magagula (born 1994), South African model, medical doctor, beauty queen and environmental activist
 Nozipho Mxakato-Diseko (born 1956), South African diplomat
 Nozipho Schroeder (born 1951), South African lawn bowler